Stephen Weiss (born April 3, 1983) is a Canadian former professional ice hockey centre who most recently played for the Detroit Red Wings, as well as the Florida Panthers, who drafted him fourth overall in the 2001 NHL Entry Draft. Weiss holds Panthers franchise records for games played and led the franchise in assists when he retired. Weiss was born in Toronto, Ontario, but grew up in nearby Markham, Ontario.

Playing career

Plymouth Whalers
Weiss played his major junior career with the Plymouth Whalers of the Ontario Hockey League (OHL), recording statistics that impressed scouts and made him one of the highest-ranked skaters in the North American Central Scouting Report. In his rookie season, Weiss recorded 66 points, impressive enough for placement on the OHL First All-Rookie Team. Weiss continued to post eye-popping numbers in his sophomore season by recording 87 points and earning a top-five position among North American skaters.

As a result of his junior accolades, Weiss was drafted fourth overall by the Florida Panthers in the 2001 NHL Entry Draft. He returned to the Whalers in 2001–02, and although his point totals decreased from the previous year, he posted a respectable 70 points.

Florida Panthers
Weiss went on to make his NHL debut during the final weeks of the 2001–02 season, recording a goal and an assist during his seven-game stint. On April 16, 2002, Weiss signed a three-year, entry-level contract with the Panthers.

In his first full NHL season, Weiss recorded six goals and 15 assists in 77 games, missing five of them with a broken toe. Weiss also played in the NHL YoungStars Game in front of his home crowd at the Office Depot Center in Sunrise, Florida, in what would be a highpoint of his season, as he recorded a goal and an assist in the game as the Eastern Conference went on to win the game 8–3. Weiss's second full season, however did not go as well, as he struggled to adjust to head coach Mike Keenan's coaching style and was at one point assigned to the Panthers' American Hockey League (AHL) affiliate, the San Antonio Rampage, for a ten-game stint. Weiss returned to the Panthers lineup in November, where he remained for the remainder of the season. He missed a significant portion of the 2003–04 season due to a sprained knee, followed by a broken leg, which caused him to miss the remainder of the season. Weiss recorded 10 goals and 19 assists in 50 games that season.

As the 2004–05 NHL season was wiped out due to a labour dispute, the Panthers assigned Weiss to their AHL affiliate in San Antonio, where he recorded 15 goals and 23 assists with the Rampage before he was loaned to the Chicago Wolves for the remainder of the season.

Weiss would go on to taste his first post-season at the professional level, as he recorded two goals and seven assists as the Wolves made their way to the 2005 Calder Cup Finals, where they eventually lost to the Philadelphia Phantoms in seven games.

When the NHL returned for the 2005–06 season, Weiss re-signed with the Panthers as a restricted free agent. He then endured one of his most frustrating campaigns, missing the majority of the season due to a serious wrist injury. Weiss recorded 29 points in 41 games with the team. The following season, Weiss returned to the Panthers lineup, but again missed significant time due to knee and shoulder injuries. He then signed a six-year contract extension with the Panthers during the off-season. Weiss, looking to improve on his showing, followed up his efforts by recording 13 goals and 29 assists in 74 games, despite missing time due to the flu and shoulder injuries.

The 2008–09 season was seen as a break-out year for Weiss, as he flourished under Head Coach Peter DeBoer, his former coach in the OHL. In that year, he played a career-high 78 games and recorded a career-high 47 assists. Weiss was also able to stay healthy, despite missing four games with a groin injury. The following season, Weiss continued his pace by recording a career-high 28 goals along with 32 assists in a career-high 80 games. In 2010–11, Weiss saw his production dip to 49 points, however, and he became a target of recurring trade rumours throughout the year.

On February 23, 2012, Weiss set a franchise record by playing in his 614th game in a Panthers jersey. He was honoured in a ceremony on February 26, 2012, before a home game against the Montreal Canadiens; he scored two goals that night, including the game winner.

After 637 career games without a Stanley Cup playoff appearance, Weiss made his playoff debut in 2012 with Florida. He recorded three goals and two assists in the Panthers' seven-game series loss to the New Jersey Devils in the Eastern Conference Quarter-finals.

Detroit Red Wings
On July 5, 2013, Weiss signed a five-year, $24.5 million contract as an unrestricted free agent with the Detroit Red Wings. With jersey number 9 retired by Detroit in honour of Detroit legend Gordie Howe, Weiss, who had worn the number during his years in Florida, switched to number 90. During Weiss' first season with the Red Wings, he was limited to just 26 games during the 2013–14 season, and did not play after December 10, following hernia surgery.
On June 30, 2015, the Red Wings bought out the final three years of Weiss's contract, releasing him to free agency.

International play
Weiss represented Team Canada at the 2002 IIHF World U20 Championships. He recorded a goal and three assists and earned a silver medal as Canada would go on to lose to Russia in the gold medal game.

Career statistics

Regular season and playoffs

International

References

External links

1983 births
Living people
Canadian ice hockey centres
Chicago Wolves players
Detroit Red Wings players
Florida Panthers draft picks
Florida Panthers players
Grand Rapids Griffins players
Ice hockey people from Toronto
National Hockey League first-round draft picks
Plymouth Whalers players
San Antonio Rampage players
Sportspeople from Markham, Ontario